The Kurilpa Bridge (originally known as the Tank Street Bridge) is a 63 million pedestrian and bicycle bridge over the Brisbane River in Brisbane, Queensland, Australia. The bridge connects Kurilpa Point in South Brisbane to Tank Street in the Brisbane central business district. In 2011, the bridge was judged World Transport Building of the Year at the World Architecture Festival.

Baulderstone built the bridge and the company's design team included Cox Rayner Architects and Arup Engineers.

A sod turning ceremony was held at Kurilpa Park, South Brisbane on 12 December 2007. The bridge was opened on 4 October 2009 by Queensland Premier Anna Bligh.

Structure
Kurilpa Bridge is the world's largest hybrid tensegrity bridge.  Only the horizontal spars conform to tensegrity principles.  The Kurilpa Bridge is a multiple-mast, cable-stay structure based on principles of tensegrity producing a synergy between balanced tension and compression components to create a light structure which is incredibly strong.

A canopy is supported by a secondary tensegrity structure. It is estimated that  of structural steel including  of helical strand cable are incorporated into the bridge.

The bridge structure comprises 18 structural steel bridge decks, 20 structural steel masts and 16 horizontal spars  or in layman's terms horizontal masts. 72 precast concrete deck slabs sit on the main bridge deck and are secured to the steel structure and together by in-situ concrete stitch pours . The complex cabling system comprises 80 main galvanised helical strand cables and 252 tensegrity cables that are made from superduplex stainless steel . The piecing together of these elements was the highest risk on the project, where any error in the dimension of one of the elements would have halted the critical path of the project. The superstructure was within 13mm of its planned vertical position in its final state at the centre of the bridge .

The bridge is lit with a sophisticated LED lighting system which can be programmed to produce an array of different lighting effects. Depending on lighting configurations, 75%-100% of the power required is provided by solar energy.
All electrical work was done by Stowe Australia.

Naming competition
A public competition was held to decide on a new name for the bridge. On 23 November 2008 it was announced that the winning entry was Kurilpa Bridge, submitted by Shane Spargo of Nundah, Queensland. The name reflects the Australian Aboriginal word for the South Brisbane and West End area, and means "place for water rats".

Gallery

See also

Bridges over the Brisbane River

References

External links

 Department of Public Works information page
 ABC "By Design" interview with Michael Raynor (April 2010) Brisbane's Kurilpa Bridge Australian Broadcasting Corporation Retrieved 2010-05-03. (including 12 mins of audio)
 Structurae: Kurilpa Bridge. Retrieved 16 March 2018.
 Kurilpa Bridge Discover Queensland Buildings website

Bridges in Brisbane
Bridges over the Brisbane River
Bridges completed in 2009
Cable-stayed bridges in Australia
Pedestrian bridges in Australia
Steel bridges in Australia
South Brisbane, Queensland
Brisbane central business district
2009 establishments in Australia